Emerson Gustavo Pinto dos Santos (born 27 February 1992), known as Emerson Santos, is a Brazilian professional footballer who plays as an attacking midfielder for Bahia, on loan from Botafogo-SP.

Honours

Club
Coritiba
 Campeonato Paranaense: 2012, 2013

References

External links
Émerson Santos at Goal
Émerson Santos at ZeroZero

1992 births
Living people
Brazilian footballers
Association football midfielders
Grêmio Foot-Ball Porto Alegrense players
Coritiba Foot Ball Club players
Santa Cruz Futebol Clube players
Mogi Mirim Esporte Clube players
Esporte Clube Passo Fundo players
Clube Atlético Tricordiano players
Clube Esportivo Aimoré players
Operário Futebol Clube (MS) players
Associação Desportiva São Caetano players
Campeonato Brasileiro Série A players
Campeonato Brasileiro Série B players
Campeonato Brasileiro Série D players